

Champions
World Series: Boston Braves over Philadelphia Athletics (4-0)

Awards and honors
Chalmers Award
 Eddie Collins, Philadelphia Athletics, 2B
 Johnny Evers, Boston Braves, 2B

MLB statistical leaders

Major league baseball final standings

American League final standings

National League final standings

Federal League final standings

Events
February 27- Jack Quinn, a pitcher for the Boston Braves, jumped from the National League to the Baltimore Terrapins of the Federal League. Quinn was one of many players from the AL and NL who jumped leagues. 
April 17- Pitcher Red Faber makes his MLB debut for the Chicago White Sox in their 6-5 victory over the winless Cleveland Naps.
April 21 - Future hall of famer Frank Chance plays his last game. He gets into the game as a defensive replacement for the New York Yankees.
May 13 – Joe Benz pitches a no hitter in a 6-1 Chicago White Sox victory over the Cleveland Naps.
June 9 – Honus Wagner of the Pittsburgh Pirates becomes the second member of the 3000 hit club.
July 1- Harry Kingman pitch hits for the New York Yankees in their 7-4 loss to the Washington Senators. Though Kingman appeared in four games in his MLB career and never got a hit, he was the first player born in China to play major league baseball. 
July 17 – Red Murray of the New York Giants catches game winning catch and is immediately struck by lightning.
September 9 – In the second game of a doubleheader, George Davis of the Boston Braves pitches a no-hitter against the Philadelphia Phillies in a 7-0 win.
August 27- Fred McMullin makes his MLB debut for the Detroit Tigers in their 9-2 loss to the Boston Red Sox. McMullin would later be infamous as one of the players banned from baseball for conspiring to throw the 1919 World Series.  
September 19 – Ed Lafitte tosses a no-hitter for the Brooklyn Tip-Tops of the Federal League in a 6-2 win over the Kansas City Packers.
September 27 – Nap Lajoie of the Cleveland Naps becomes the third member of the 3000 hit club.
October 13 – The Boston Braves defeat the Philadelphia Athletics, 3-1, in Game 4 of the World Series to win their first World Championship, four games to none. This was the first four-game sweep in World Series history. The Cubs had defeated the Tigers four games to none in 1907, but Game 1 had ended in a tie before the Cubs won the next four in a row.
November 1 – Philadelphia Athletics owner Connie Mack starts a fire sale, asking waivers on Jack Coombs, Eddie Plank and Chief Bender. Coombs goes to the Brooklyn Robins as Plank and Bender escape Mack's maneuvering by jumping to the Federal League. Despite the American League Pennant title, Philadelphia fans did not support the Athletics and the club lost $50,000.

Births

January
January 4 – Herman Franks
January 5 – Joe Grace
January 5 – Jack Salveson
January 10 - Carrenza Howard
January 13 – Roberto Olivo
January 19 – Benny Culp
January 19 – Al Piechota
January 21 – Blix Donnelly
January 23 – Merv Connors
January 28 – Alf Anderson
January 31 – Mel Mazzera
January 31 – Charlie Wiedemeyer

February
February 5 – John Gaddy
February 8 – Mel Bosser
February 8 – Bert Haas
February 9 – Bill Veeck
February 17 – Rod Dedeaux
February 19 – John Bissant
February 19 – Stan Sperry
February 21 – Milt Gray
February 23 – Lynn Myers
February 23 – Pedro Pagés
February 23 – Mike Tresh

March
March 1 – Harry Caray
March 4 – Art Rebel
March 7 – Joe Gallagher
March 12 – Otto Huber
March 14 – Red Marion
March 21 – Boyd Perry
March 26 – Hal Epps

April
April 1 – George Bradley
April 1 – Moe Franklin
April 6 – Dee Moore
April 8 – Andy Karl
April 14 – Earl Bumpus
April 17 – Lefty Smoll
April 27 – George Archie
April 27 – Larry Crawford
April 27 – Jug Thesenga
April 29 – Marv Breuer

May
May 4 – Harl Maggert
May 9 – Culley Rikard
May 10 – Russ Bauers
May 11 – Al Williams
May 14 – Jim Shilling
May 14 – Albert Zachary
May 15 – Jimmy Wasdell
May 20 – Stan Benjamin
May 27 – Johnny Welaj

June
June 6 – Eddie Silber
June 12 – Pete Naktenis
June 14 – George Myatt
June 16 – Johnnie Wittig
June 22 – Jim Asbell
June 22 – Maury Newlin
June 24 – Hal Kelleher
June 27 – Irv Bartling

July
July 2 – Bob Allen
July 3 – Buddy Rosar
July 8 – George Fallon
July 11 – George Binks
July 11 – Joseph Jessup
July 12 – Al Glossop
July 14 – José Pérez Colmenares
July 16 – Don Ross
July 17 – Charlie Frye
July 18 – Andy Gilbert
July 18 – Ben Huffman
July 19 – Marius Russo
July 23 – Frank Croucher
July 26 – Ellis Kinder
July 30 – Steve Peek
July 31 – Elmer Riddle

August
August 5 – Bob Daughters
August 5 – Bob Loane
August 6 – Tommy Reis
August 22 – Augie Donatelli
August 24 – George Turbeville
August 26 – Al Cuccinello
August 30 –  Buddy Hancken

September
September 7 – Hermina Franks
September 11 – Clay Smith
September 18 – Bill Sodd
September 23 – Mack Stewart
September 27 – Bill Jackowski
September 28 – Dick Midkiff
September 29 – Johnny Johnson

October
October 3 – Woody Wheaton
October 4 – Bruce Sloan
October 6 – George Washburn
October 10 – Italo Chelini
October 10 – Tommy Fine
October 13 – Frankie Hayes
October 14 – Harry Brecheen
October 28 – Johnny Rigney
October 30 – Lefty Wilkie

November
November 2 – Jesse Flores
November 2 – Tom McBride
November 2 – Johnny Vander Meer
November 4 – Sig Gryska
November 4 – Les McCrabb
November 5 – Mark Mauldin
November 10 – Angel Fleitas
November 12 – Emerson Dickman
November 13 – Jack Hallett
November 15 – Mickey Livingston
November 15 – Maurice Van Robays
November 19 – Eddie Morgan
November 21 – Pinky Jorgensen
November 21 – George Scharein
November 22 – Alex Pitko
November 23 – Emmett Ashford
November 23 – Mel Preibisch
November 25 – Joe DiMaggio
November 25 – Gene Handley
November 26 – Ed Weiland
November 29 – Joe Orengo

December
December 6 – Turkey Tyson
December 9 – Hank Camelli
December 11 – Bill Nicholson
December 12 – Buzzie Bavasi
December 14 – Rusty Peters
December 17 – Dave Smith

Deaths

January–April
January 11 – Walt Goldsby, 52, outfielder who hit .236 for five teams in two different leagues between 1884 and 1888.
January 13 – Aaron Clapp, 57, first baseman for the 1879 Troy Trojans of the National League.
January 20 – Pat Lyons, 53, Canadian second baseman who played for the Cleveland Spiders of the National League in 1890.
February 1 – Sam Weaver, 58, pitcher who posted a 68-80 record and a 3.21 ERA with five teams in four different leagues from 1875 to 1886.
February 9 – Buster Brown, 32, National League pitcher who had a 51-103 record and a 3.21 ERA for the St. Louis Cardinals (1905–'07), Philadelphia Phillies (1907–'09) and Boston Doves/Braves (1909–13).
February 9 – Jack Farrell, 56, second baseman for 11 seasons (1879–1889), who played bulk of his career with the Providence Grays.
February 21 – Farmer Vaughn, 49, catcher who hit .274 with 21 home runs and 525 RBI in 925 games for five teams from 1886 to 1899.
February 23 – Nat Jewett, 69, catcher for the 1872 Brooklyn Eckfords of the National Association.
February 28 – Art Sladen, 53, outfielder for the Boston Reds of the Union Association in 1884.
March 24 – Jack Brennan, 50, catcher/infielder who played from 1884 to 1890 with four teams in four different leagues.
April 1 – Rube Waddell, 37, pitcher for the Philadelphia Athletics who led AL in strikeouts six consecutive years, including modern record of 349 in 1904; four-time 20-game winner led AL in ERA twice with career 2.16 mark, best ever by left-hander with 1500 innings; 2316 strikeouts ranked third in history upon retirement, 50 shutouts ranked fifth; first major leaguer to strike out side on nine pitches. According to Lee Allen, in The American League Story (1961), there were those who considered it appropriate that Waddell should die on April Fool's Day.
April 7 – Charlie Ganzel, 51, catcher for four different teams during fourteen seasons, and a member of the 1887 Detroit Wolverines National League champion team that won the first ever World Series, beating the St. Louis Browns ten games to five.
April 16 – Podge Weihe, 51, American Association outfielder who hit .254 in two seasons with the Indianapolis Hoosiers (1883) and Cincinnati RedStockings (1884).
April 27 – Herb Worth, 66, outfielder for the 1872 Brooklyn Atlantics of the National Association .

May–August
May 8 – George Fox, 45, first baseman for the Louisville Colonels of the American Association (1891) and the Pittsburgh Pirates of the National League (1899).
May 20 – Chub Collins, 56, shortstop for the National League Buffalo Bisons in 1884, on a talented team featuring the all-star infield known as the "Big Four": Dan Brouthers, Hardy Richardson, Deacon White and later Jack Rowe.
May 26 – Jumbo Latham, 61, first baseman who hit .247 in 334 games for five different teams from 1875 to 1884, while managing two of them (1875, 1882).
June 16 – Bert Dorr, 52, pitcher for the 1882 St. Louis Browns.
July 5 – Wee Willie Mills, 36, pitcher for the National League New York Giants in 1901.
July 9 – Ossee Schreckengost, 39, catcher for eleven seasons, most notably with the Philadelphia Athletics from 1902 to 1908, who pioneered one-handed style and batted .300 twice.
August 1 – Gid Gardner, 55, outfielder/pitcher from 1879 to 1888, who hit a .233 average and had a 2-10 record for eight teams in three different leagues.
August 1 – Con Murphy, 50, pitcher who posted a 4-13 record with the Philadelphia Quakers (1884) and Brooklyn Ward's Wonders (1890).
August 17 – Harry Steinfeldt, 36, third baseman for the Cincinnati Reds and Chicago Cubs who led National League in hits, doubles and RBI once each, batting .300 twice, and hit .471 in the 1907 World Series to lead the Cubs to the championship.

September–December
September 2 – Al Metcalf, 61, appeared in eight games for the 1875 New York Mutuals.
September 9 – Willie Garoni, 37, pitcher for the 1899 New York Giants of the National League.
September 14 – Jim McDonald, 54, third baseman who played from 1884 to 1885 for three teams in three different leagues.
November 2 – Jack Sheridan, 52, American League umpire since the league's 1901 formation, previously in the Players' League and National League, who officiated in four of the first seven World Series, and introduced the practice of crouching behind the catcher when calling balls and strikes.
November 9 – Danny Green, 38, outfielder for the Orphans and White Sox Chicago teams and a four-time .300 hitter who died following complications related to a beaning.
November 10 – Jack Heinzman, 51, first baseman for the 1886 Louisville Colonels of the American Association.
November 10 – Heinie Reitz, 47, National League second baseman for the Orioles, Senators and Pirates from 1893 to 1899, who hit .292 in 724 games and led the league with 31 triples in 1894.
November 28 – Tug Wilson, 54, outfielder and catcher for the 1884 Brooklyn Atlantics.
December 11 – Harry Burrell, 47, pitcher who posted a 4-2 record and a 4.81 ERA with the 1891 St. Louis Browns of the American Association.
December 22 – Phil Powers, 60, catcher who played from 1878 to 1885 for five different teams in the National League and American Association.
December 31 – John Farrow, 61, National Association catcher for the Elizabeth Resolutes (1873) and Brooklyn Atlantics (1874, 1884).
December 31 – John O'Brien, 63, outfielder for the 1884 Baltimore Monumentals of the Union Association.